John Paul College is an independent, non-denominational Christian early learning, primary, and secondary day and boarding school, located in the Logan City suburb of Daisy Hill, Queensland, Australia.

Established in 1982, the school enrolled 1,711 students in 2018, from early learning and Year K to Year 12, of whom two percent identified as Indigenous Australians and 24 percent came from a language background other than English. John Paul International College provides English Language Studies for international students keen to engage in study in Australia.

The principal is Karen Spiller . The school is located on a  campus, and is a member of The Associated Schools.

Overview 
The foundation principal was Cec Munns, who was also a member of the steering committee which had urged the Brisbane Catholic Education Office to establish a Catholic secondary school in the area. This request was denied, so the committee worked with the local Catholic, Anglican, and Uniting parishes to establish the school, which opened on Australia Day 1982 with 144 students in Years 8 and 9.

John Paul College has twice been judged as one of the best ten schools in Australia in a nationwide series conducted by The Australian newspaper in both 2002 and 2003.

John Paul provides group or private instrumental, vocal, dance, and drama lessons on a weekly basis.

Organization 
The College comprises three schools:

Primary school is broken down into an additional three schools: 
 Early Learning (childcare, kindergarten and prep)
 Junior Primary (Years 1, 2 and 3)
 Senior Primary (Years 4, 5 and 6)

History 
The college was founded through the collaborative efforts of four clergymen from three different denominations: Roman Catholic, Anglican, and Uniting. All four were strong believers in ecumenism, which continues to guide the College ethos to this day.

Father Rollo Enright, the Catholic parish priest at St Peter's, Rochedale, had a strong commitment to ecumenism and was the driving force behind the push for the ecumenical concept of the college when it became clear that the proposal to build a Catholic College at Daisy Hill was rejected by the Catholic Education Office. Father Leo Burke was the founding Catholic parish priest of St Edward's, Daisy Hill and remains involved with the college to this day as its patron. Another ecumenist, Patrick Doulin, was parish priest of St Mark's Anglican community, Slacks Creek, and the official representative of the Anglican hierarchy. Reverend Bryan Gilmour, the pastor of Logan Uniting Church, was a prominent leader of the ecumenical movement within his own Church and, with the others, enthusiastically supported the establishment of John Paul College as an ecumenical school.  It was indeed, he who when it appeared all avenues to establish the college were exhausted, suggested that the founders pray that, "not our will, but God's, be done".

Houses
Students are allocated to one of the four houses and will remain in that house for the duration of their time at JPC. Siblings are assigned to the same house.

Boarding
JPC offers accommodation for students in Years 7 to 12. The boarders are housed in a "village-style" environment called Fenton Village. Vegetable gardens surround individual residential homes, which accommodates eight boarders each. The Director of Boarding, Assistant Director of Boarding, House Mother and four Tutors live on-site.

Notable alumni

Sports
Olympians
 Genevieve LaCaze
 Mitch Larkin
 Keryn McMaster
 Ki Sung-yueng
 Michael Turnball
Association football
 Ki Sung-yueng
 Michael Turnball
 Sin Chang-moo
Australian rules footballers
 Shaun Hampson
 Jesse White
Men's basketball
 Tim Coenraad
 Rhys Martin
 Cameron Tragardh
Women's basketball
 Maddison Allen
 Mikhaela Donnelly
 Sarah Graham
 Kalani Purcell
 Kristy Wallace
Netball
 Madeline McAuliffe
 Clare McMeniman
 Laura Scherian
Rugby union
 Jake Schatz

Others
 Raghe Abdi – Somali-Australian terrorist.
 Yassmin Abdel-Magied – Sudanese-Australian mechanical engineer.
 David Baxby – CEO, Virgin Management Asia Pacific.
 Gong Hyo-jin – South Korean actress.
 Dami Im – South Korean-born Australian singer.
 Taj Pabari – 2017 Queensland Young Australian of the Year.
 Jesse Wardlaw – AFL W Player

See also

List of schools in Queensland
Education in Australia
Ecumenism

References

External links 
 
 JPConnect
 John Paul International College

Educational institutions established in 1982
Private schools in Queensland
High schools in Queensland
Junior School Heads Association of Australia Member Schools
International Baccalaureate schools in Australia
Schools in Logan City
1982 establishments in Australia
Boarding schools in Queensland
The Associated Schools member schools